Foisches is a commune in the Ardennes department in northern France.

The Pointe de Givet National Nature Reserve is partly located on the commune.

Population

See also
Communes of the Ardennes department

References

Communes of Ardennes (department)
Ardennes communes articles needing translation from French Wikipedia